William Michael Dermot Persson (born 27 September 1927) is a former Suffragan Bishop of Doncaster.

Persson was educated at Oriel College, Oxford. Ordained in 1954, he began his career with a  curacy at Emmanuel, South Croydon and was then successively: Vicar of Christ Church, Barnet; Rector of Bebington; and finally, before his elevation to the episcopate, Knutsford. Since retiring to Sturminster Newton Bishop William continues to serve the church as an assistant bishop within the Bath and Wells Diocese.

References

1927 births
Alumni of Oriel College, Oxford
20th-century Church of England bishops
Living people
Bishops of Doncaster